The 2016–17 Loyola Greyhounds women's basketball team represented Loyola University Maryland during the 2016–17 NCAA Division I women's basketball season. The Greyhounds, led by eleventh year head coach Joe Logan, played their home games at Reitz Arena and were members of the Patriot League. They finished the season 11–20, 6–12 in Patriot League play to finish in a tie for seventh place. They advanced to the quarterfinals of the Patriot League women's tournament where they lost to Bucknell.

Roster

Schedule

|-
!colspan=9 style="background:#00563F; color:#DBD9D1;"| Non-conference regular season

|-
!colspan=9 style="background:#00563F; color:#DBD9D1;"| Patriot League regular season

|-
!colspan=9 style="background:#00563F; color:#DBD9D1;"| Patriot League Women's Tournament

See also
 2016–17 Loyola Greyhounds men's basketball team

References

Loyola
Loyola Greyhounds women's basketball seasons